CPE may refer to:

Biochemistry
 Carbapenemase-producing enterobacteriaceae, a "superbug" resistant to antibiotics 
 Carboxypeptidase E, an enzyme involved in the biosynthesis of neuropeptides and peptide hormones
 Clostridium perfringens enterotoxin, a contributor to food poisoning 
 Cytopathic effect, changes in cells caused by viruses 
 Cytoplasmic polyadenylation element, an RNA sequence
 Chlorinated polyethylene, a thermoplastic polymer
 Core promoter element, in DNA, initiating gene transcription

Telecommunications
 Customer-premises equipment, any equipment which is the property of the network operator and located on the customer premises

Science
 Carnian pluvial episode/event, a climatic episode and minor extinction-radiation event in the Triassic
 Carbon paste electrode, a special type of electrodes used in electrochemistry
 Charged-particle equilibrium
 Computer engineering
 Constant phase element of an equivalent electrical circuit

Education
 Certificate of Primary Education, an academic qualification in Mauritius awarded upon the completion of primary school
 Certificate of Proficiency in English, a general English exam provided by the University of Cambridge
 Certified Professional Electrologist, board certification credential for permanent hair removal specialists 
 Clinical pastoral education, training in pastoral care for religious workers 
 Common Professional Examination, a course which allows non-law graduates in England and Wales to convert to law after university
 Continuing professional education, or continuing professional development, is the means by which professionals maintain and develop the qualities required in their working lives
 École supérieure de chimie physique électronique de Lyon (CPE Lyon), a French engineering school
 Kentucky Council on Postsecondary Education
 Committee for Private Education, an accreditation body for private schools and tertiary education providers in Singapore

Business
 Centrally planned economy
 First Employment Contract (contrat première embauche), a French form of work contract, retracted by the government in Spring 2006
 Cost Per Enplanement, a term used in commercial aviation regarding airport costs
 Cost per engagement, an online advertising selling model in which the vendor defines the "engagement" as form of currency or metric

Other uses
 Chinese Pidgin English, a pidgin language spoken in parts of China in the 17th to 19th centuries.
 Common Platform Enumeration, a component of the Security Content Automation Protocol (SCAP)
 Creative Power Entertaining, Chinese animation company
 CPE, IATA airport code for Ing. Alberto Acuña Ongay International Airport in Campeche, Mexico
 Centristi per l'Europa (Centrists for Europe), an Italian political party
 Carl Philipp Emanuel Bach (1714–1788), German Classical period musician and composer